The eighth series of the British science fiction television programme Doctor Who began on 23 August 2014 with "Deep Breath" and ended with "Death in Heaven" on 8 November 2014. The series was officially ordered in May 2013, and led by head writer and executive producer Steven Moffat, alongside executive producer Brian Minchin. Nikki Wilson, Peter Bennett and Paul Frift served as producers. The series is the eighth to air following the programme's revival in 2005, the thirty-fourth season overall, and the first series since series five not to be split into two parts.

The series is the first to star Peter Capaldi as the Twelfth Doctor, an alien Time Lord who travels through time and space in his TARDIS, which appears to be a British police box on the outside. It also stars Jenna Coleman as his companion, Clara Oswald. Also playing a major recurring role in the series is Samuel Anderson as Danny Pink, Clara's boyfriend. The main story arc revolves around a mysterious woman called Missy (portrayed by Michelle Gomez), who is often seen welcoming people who have died throughout the series to the "Promised Land", a place that serves as an apparent afterlife to deceased characters. Missy's true identity is later revealed to be the Doctor's arch-enemy, the Master, who has hatched a plan using the help of the Cybermen and through manipulation of the Doctor and Clara's relationship.

Steven Moffat was directly involved with the writing of seven episodes; he received sole credit for four episodes, and was credited as a co-writer for the remaining three. Other writers who worked on this series included Phil Ford, Mark Gatiss, Stephen Thompson, Gareth Roberts, Peter Harness, Jamie Mathieson (who wrote two), and novelist Frank Cottrell-Boyce. Directors of the series included ones who had previously worked with Moffat on the show, and brand new ones. Filming began on 6 January 2014 and lasted exactly seven months, ending on 6 August 2014.

The series premiere was watched by 9.17 million viewers, the highest ratings for a premiere since Matt Smith's first episode as the Doctor back in 2010. Ratings remained consistent throughout the course of the series, seeing a low of 6.71 million viewers with the episode "Flatline", and ended with 7.60 million people watching the finale (up 150,000 viewers from the previous season finale). The eighth series became the highest-rated series ever in the US with an average audience of 2.04 million viewers. Critical reaction to the series was highly positive, with praise going to the writing, directing, and acting, with a number of individual episodes receiving critical acclaim.

Episodes

The first episode of the series, "Deep Breath", has a running time of 76 minutes, making it - at the time - the second-longest episode of the revived Doctor Who era beginning in 2005, the longest being "The Day of the Doctor" with a running time of 77 minutes (this episode was eventually beaten by 
Power of the Doctor, with its 88 minute runtime, in 2022). As with the previous series, Series 8 consists mainly of standalone episodes; the series finale was the first two-part story after "The Rebel Flesh" / "The Almost People" from the midpoint of Series 6 in 2011.

Casting

The show's star from 2010, Matt Smith announced in June 2013 that he would be leaving Doctor Who following the 2013 Christmas episode "The Time of the Doctor". His replacement was announced, after several weeks of speculation, on a special live broadcast called Doctor Who Live: The Next Doctor on 4 August as Peter Capaldi, who up to that point was best known for portraying spin doctor Malcolm Tucker in the BBC comedy series The Thick of It. Capaldi had previously appeared on the show as Caecilius in "The Fires of Pompeii", as well as John Frobisher in the Doctor Who spin-off Torchwood: Children of Earth.

In October 2013, actress Neve McIntosh stated in an interview that recurring characters Madame Vastra, Jenny Flint and Strax (known to fans as "the Paternoster Gang") were due to return in the series premiere "Deep Breath". On 24 February 2014, it was announced that Gavin & Stacey actor Samuel Anderson would join the cast as the recurring character Danny Pink, a teacher and Clara's colleague at Coal Hill School.

Beyond the return of the Paternoster Gang, and the casting of Samuel Anderson, the first major guest star of the series was announced in March 2014 when it was revealed that Keeley Hawes had been cast in episode five as a character named Ms. Delphox. Subsequently, Tom Riley, Ben Miller, Hermione Norris, Frank Skinner, Foxes, Christopher Fairbank, Sanjeev Bhaskar, and Chris Addison were cast in guest roles.

Jemma Redgrave and Ingrid Oliver reprised their roles of Kate Stewart and Osgood, respectively, last seen in the fiftieth anniversary special "The Day of the Doctor", in the two-part series final "Dark Water" / "Death in Heaven". Michelle Gomez was later cast as a character named Missy, described as "The Gatekeeper of the Nethersphere" and was originally announced to be featured in the series finale; however Gomez also appeared in the series' first, second, sixth, ninth and tenth episodes as part of a recurring story arc. In "Dark Water", it was revealed that Missy is in fact The Master, with Gomez taking over the role from John Simm.

Production

Development
The series was officially ordered on 20 May 2013, and led by head writer and executive producer Steven Moffat, who returned as showrunner from the previous series, alongside executive producer Brian Minchin. At Comic-Con 2013, Moffat said that, although much of the focus at that point remained on the 50th anniversary and Christmas specials, development for series 8 was under way, stating that the scripts were arriving for the series, knowing the plot and conclusion of the series' episodes.

In an interview with Doctor Who Magazine, Moffat likened his initial plans for the Twelfth Doctor to Tom Baker's first season, with the Doctor being tricky to deal with at the beginning, but with the benefit of familiar characters to ease through the transition; Moffat also commented on the situation of Clara having to deal with the Doctor changing. Moffat also stated that, unlike the situation with Colin Baker, reference would be made to Peter Capaldi's previous appearances in the Whoniverse, specifically "The Fires of Pompeii" (2008) and Torchwood (2009). Moffat stated that he remembered Russell T Davies creating a plan to explain Capaldi's repeat appearances in Doctor Who-related media, and how he contacted Davies to confirm that the plan still worked with Capaldi portraying the Twelfth Doctor.

Writing

Chris Chibnall, who had written five previous episodes of Doctor Who, and a few for Torchwood, indicated in April 2013 that he had been approached by Moffat to contribute to Series 8. The subsequent success of his drama series, Broadchurch, led Chibnall to state that his schedule would not allow him to contribute to this particular series, although he was willing to write for Doctor Who in the future.

Neil Cross, who wrote two episodes in Series 7, also stated a desire to write for Series 8. Cross confirmed that he would be writing at least one episode for Series 8 in August 2013, while Neil Gaiman, who contributed one episode to Series 6 and another episode to Series 7, and Frank Cottrell-Boyce also stated that they were developing scripts. However, neither were able to confirm initially whether these would be for Series 8 or a subsequent series. On 4 July 2014, it was confirmed Boyce would also write an episode. In a 2022 newsletter, Grant Morrison revealed they had pitched ideas for episodes, including for a new monster, but none were commissioned.

Gareth Roberts, who had written five previous episodes of Doctor Who, returned for Series 8.

On 7 January 2014, it was announced that former producers Peter Bennett (producer in 2010, who had also worked on spin-off Torchwood and former showrunner Russell T Davies' Wizards vs Aliens) and Nikki Wilson (script editor and producer from 2009 to 2010) would produce the series. Will Oswald edited Episodes 1, 2, 5 and 6.

On 26 March 2014, it was announced that Mark Gatiss would write either one or two episodes for the series. In a Q&A in Brazil he said that he believed that Jane Austen should feature in an episode, just like other famous authors who have appeared on the show, such as William Shakespeare, Charles Dickens, and Agatha Christie.

In April 2014, it was announced Peter Harness and Jamie Mathieson would be writing for the series.

Design changes

The introduction of a new lead actor brought about another change to the title sequence. The sequence for Series 8 was inspired by a fan-made sequence produced by Billy Hanshaw, an illustrator and 3D animator from Leeds, who posted it on YouTube. This eventually came to the attention of Steven Moffat, who subsequently based the official sequence on Hanshaw's work.

As director of the first block, Ben Wheatley was able to make lasting modifications to the TARDIS set. Wheatley had the cinematographer change the central column from green to golden, and had the art department create a replica of Tommy Westphall's snowglobe from St. Elsewhere, which Wheatley placed in the TARDIS set as a reference to the theory that all television exists in a shared dream reality.

Music
Murray Gold composed the soundtrack to this series, with orchestration by Ben Foster.

Filming
In August 2013, actress Jenna Coleman initially announced that filming was scheduled to begin in January 2014, after the broadcast of Peter Capaldi's initial appearance in the Christmas special that would contain the Doctor's regeneration.
In late 2013, announcements were made for various directing appointments for the new series, with a total of six episodes allocated initially; in October, the first two episodes of the series were allocated to Ben Wheatley, with production due to start in December 2013. In November and December two further episodes were each allocated to Paul Murphy and Douglas Mackinnon. The first read through took place on 17 December 2013.

Filming began on 6 January 2014 in Cardiff, with Peter Capaldi and Jenna Coleman shooting their first scenes for Series 8 on 7 January 2014. On 22 February 2014 it was announced that Paul Wilmshurst would also direct an episode. On 11 May 2014, it was announced that an episode directed by Wilmshurst and written by Harness would be filming in Lanzarote, the second time Doctor Who has filmed there after the 1984 serial Planet of Fire. Filming took place in Volcán del Cuervo, also known as the Raven's Volcano. On 14 May 2014 it was announced that American director Rachel Talalay would be directing two episodes of the eighth series. On 2 July 2014 filming for the finale took place at the Box Cemetery in Llanelli, previously the location for the final scenes of the seventh series mid-season finale "The Angels Take Manhattan". On 4 July 2014 it was announced that Sheree Folkson would direct an episode. On 19 July 2014 filming with the Cybermen took place outside St Paul's Cathedral in London, which had previously been the setting of 1968's The Invasion. Filming on the series was completed on 6 August 2014.

Production blocks were arranged as follows:

Release

Promotion
On 10 June 2014, the BBC announced a "World Tour" promoting Series 8 to take place from 7–19 August 2014 and featuring Peter Capaldi, Jenna Coleman and Steven Moffat. They visited seven cities across five continents in 12 days, where they attended fan events and media interviews. The destinations were Cardiff, London, Seoul, Sydney, New York City, Mexico City and Rio de Janeiro. On 13 July 2014 the first full-length trailer was aired on BBC One, during the final half-time of the 2014 FIFA World Cup.

Leading up to the launch of the series, four teaser trailers were released on 23 May, 27 June, 4 July and 27 July 2014. On 7 August 2014 an interview with Peter Capaldi was shown on BBC News, featuring clips from the second episode. Starting on 18 August, the BBC released a series of six short teasers counting down to the series' premiere.

Episode leaks 
On 6 July 2014, the scripts and rough "pre air screeners" for the first five episodes of the series were inadvertently leaked online from BBC Worldwide's Latin America headquarters. The leaked scripts were immediately shared online, prompting wide coverage in the media. In a statement, BBC Worldwide asked people with access to the leaked material to keep the storylines of the five episodes secret.

On 12 July, the black and white, watermarked "pre air screener" of "Deep Breath" was uploaded to The Pirate Bay. The video was a rough cut of series 8's first episode, missing many visual effects, but otherwise mostly complete. The video leak was also widely covered in the media, but the BBC confirmed the leak was from the same source as the script, and had been contained. Despite the fact that the initial version of "Into the Dalek" contained a glitch that prevented downloading, a workable version found its way online by the second week of August 2014.

"Robot of Sherwood" was subsequently leaked in the third week of August, with fears that the rough cuts of the next three episodes, which were also included in the exposed file, would also be made available through file sharing sites. "Listen" and "Time Heist" were also leaked later on.

Broadcast
Series 8 was initially slated to be broadcast starting in the late summer of 2014, with Steven Moffat acknowledging this likelihood in July 2013, prior to the announcement of Peter Capaldi's casting. In September however it was suggested that the broadcast date would likely be pushed back to the third quarter of 2014, which would tie in with the production starting in January 2014 and typically lasting up to 9 months before the transmission of the first episode. It was also suggested that the series would be a twelve rather than thirteen episode run. In an October 2013 interview, Steven Moffat said that there would be at least 13 episodes in the series.

In February 2014, Ben Wheatley, director of the first two episodes, stated that his episodes would begin airing in the summer of 2014.

At the final 50th anniversary event at the BFI in December 2013, Steven Moffat confirmed that the series would contain 13 episodes and would be broadcast in the second half of 2014. He also stated that it would not be split into two parts, instead being transmitted continuously. Moffat also announced that this would be the standard broadcast format for future series. A teaser trailer released on 23 May 2014 revealed that the eighth series would air in August 2014. An extended teaser released on 27 June 2014 showed the airdate to be 23 August 2014.

The first episode, "Deep Breath", had its world premiere on 7 August 2014, at the Cardiff visit on the World Tour. Following additional preview screenings at other World Tour visits, the story also received a worldwide cinema release at participating cinemas on 23 August 2014, the same day as its television broadcast.

"Dark Water" and "Death in Heaven" received a 3D cinematic release on 15 and 16 September 2015.

BBC America in the United States aired the series the same day as the United Kingdom, and in Canada, it was aired on Space, the science fiction/fantasy channel. ABC TV in Australia aired the series live with the UK.

Home media

The opening episode of the series "Deep Breath" was released as a standalone DVD and Blu-ray on 15 September 2014 in Region 2, 9 September 2014 in Region 1, and 10 September 2014 in Region 4. A 5-disc DVD and Blu-ray boxset containing all 12 episodes was released 24 November 2014 in Region 2, 19 November in Region 4 and 9 December 2014 in Region 1. The 3D edition of "Dark Water" and "Death in Heaven" will receive a 3D Blu-ray release on 22 September 2015 in Region 1.

In print

Reception

Ratings

Critical reception

Critical reaction to series 8 was highly positive, with some critics labelling it a return to form and one of Doctor Who strongest seasons. On Rotten Tomatoes, the series holds an approval rating of 88%, based on 26 reviews, and an average score of 8.17/10, with the website's critics consensus stating that "Like a TARDIS dropping down in a burst of excitement, Peter Capaldi adds a revitalizing blast of boldness and humor to Doctor Whos time-tested formula." Metacritic gave the series a weighted average score of 80/100, signifying "generally favourable reviews". Ian Jane of DVD Talk gave the series 4.5 out of 5, calling it an improvement over the Matt Smith years, praising Capaldi's performance for "[breathing] new life to the show", Clara's character development and the writing, and found the series' flaws not to overshadow its overall quality. Many critics gave favourable praise towards the show's renewed focus on character development and the darker tone of the stories, yet the Radio Times reported that the latter element drew a degree of controversy after it received criticism from parents of young children.

Critical reception to individual episodes was predominantly positive, with "Listen" and "Dark Water" receiving critical acclaim after many critics noted them as potential classics and some of Doctor Who finest episodes. "Deep Breath", "Into the Dalek", "Time Heist", "The Caretaker",  "Flatline" and "Death in Heaven" also received predominantly positive reviews from critics. "Kill the Moon" widely divided critics after its broadcast - some praised it as a classic matching that of "Listen", while others found it a weak or badly-scripted episode. Dan Martin, writing for The Guardian, criticised "Mummy on the Orient Express"; despite other critics giving the episode positive reviews—his focus was on the display of "sexual tension" between the Doctor and Clara that went against views of the show's cast, who previously stated that there would be no flirting between the two.

Awards and nominations

Soundtrack
Selected pieces of score from this series, as composed by Murray Gold, were released in a 3-CD set on 18 May 2015 by Silva Screen Records along with music from the 2014 Christmas special "Last Christmas".

References

Series 08
 
Series 08
2014 British television seasons